Zingales is a surname. Notable people with the surname include:

Francesco Zingales (1884–1959), Italian general
Luigi Zingales (born 1963), Italian finance professor
Matteo Zingales (born 1980), Australian film score composer

See also
Donald P. Zingale, American official